WTMN (1430 kHz) is a commercial AM radio station in Gainesville, Florida.  It is owned by MARC Radio Gainesville, LLC, and broadcasts to the Gainesville-Ocala radio market. Programming is simulcast on co-owned AM 720 WRZN in Hernando and on translator station W242CS on 96.3 MHz in Gainesville.

WTMN's format is Christian radio instructional and preaching programs.  Some national religious shows heard on WTMN include Dr. Charles Stanley, Dr. James Dobson, Jay Sekulow and Rick Warren.  The station calls itself "The Shepherd Radio."

History
WTMN signed on the air in January 1990 as WWLO.  It was a daytimer with 2,500 watts power, and required to be off the air at night to avoid interfering with other stations on AM 1430.  It was diplexed on the WLUS tower (now WDVH) on SE 27th street in Gainesville.  The station initially broadcast an urban contemporary format. That format was moved to sister station 101.3 WTMG in 1993.

After that, several attempts were made to launch a sports radio format.  But they were not successful because the dominant Gainesville team, the University of Florida Gators, are heard on AM 850 WRUF, the University's commercial radio station.

The station switched to Gospel radio in 2001, and later switched to a Christian radio format.

In 2003 the station upgraded its daytime power to 10,000 watts and in 2004 the station added 45 watts of night time power.

References

External links

www.sgnthelight.com/

Radio stations established in 1988
1988 establishments in Florida
TMN